Adeeba Nazeer, also known as Talat Siddiqui was a Pakistani actress and singer. She acted in both Urdu and Punjabi films and is known for her roles in films Ishq-e-Habib (1965), Kon Kisi Ka (1966), Lori (1966), Yaar Maar (1967), Chacha Ji (1967), Behan Bhai (1968), Ladla (1969), Andaleeb (1969), Umrao Jan Ada (1972), Baghi Tay Farangi (1976).

Early life 
Adeeba Nazeer was born in 1939 at Shimla, British India. She completed her studies from School in Shimla with FA. Talat's father named Nazir Ahmad was a government servant.

Career 
In 1956 she along with her family migrated to Pakistan and lived at Karachi and her husband was imprisoned in a court case. Talat was the eldest among her siblings and she had gave birth to Nahid Siddiqui in order to take of them she went for audition to Radio Pakistan and was accepted then she changed her name to Talat Siddiqui. She did playback singing in some films and later she acted in films Ishq-e-Habib, Tasvir, Aarzoo, Dard-e-Dil and Phir Subah Ho Gi. Then she appeared in films Doraha, Main Woh Nahin, Jani Dushman, Mera Veer, Ik Si Maa and Panchhi Tay Pardesi. Talat also worked in dramas many on PTV including Dehleez, Kahan Hai Manzil, Zarb Gulab, Hisaar, Waris and Dhund Kay Uss Par.

Personal life  
She married Bashir Ahmed Siddiqui when she fifteen years at the insistence of her father who was a chronic patient. She had two daughters including singer Arifa Siddiqui and Nahid Siddiqui a famous dancer. Talat's younger sister Rehana Siddiqui was also an actress and her niece Fariha Pervez is a singer.

Illness and death 
She contracted a prolonged illnees and was later put on ventilator but her conditioned worsened from which she died in May 9th, 2021 on Saturday at age 82 and was laid to rest in Canal View Society graveyard in Lahore.

Filmography

Television

Film

References

External links
 

1939 births
20th-century Pakistani actresses
Pakistani film actresses
Pakistani television actresses
Pakistani radio personalities
Actresses in Punjabi cinema
Radio personalities from Lahore
21st-century Pakistani actresses
20th-century Pakistani women singers
Singers from Lahore
2021 deaths
Urdu-language singers
21st-century Pakistani women singers
Pakistani playback singers
Pakistani women singers
Punjabi-language singers
Urdu playback singers
Actresses in Urdu cinema